The Dolph Aluck Smokehouse is a stone smokehouse located on the north side of Milford Rd., in Pendleton County, Kentucky near Falmouth.  It faces the confluence of the North Fork Licking River and the Licking River.  It was listed on the National Register of Historic Places in 1987.

It was built in the mid-1800s and was deemed significant as a "Typical early Kentucky smokehouse in good condition."  It is believed to have been built by Dolph Aluck, owner of brick Greek Revival house at the site.

References

Smokehouses
National Register of Historic Places in Pendleton County, Kentucky
Agricultural buildings and structures on the National Register of Historic Places in Kentucky